Kevin Grant Hague (born 18 March 1960) is a New Zealand activist and former chief executive and politician. He was a Member of Parliament for the Green Party from 2008 to 2016, and served as chief executive of Forest & Bird, an independent New Zealand conservation organisation, from October 2016 to April 2022. In July 2022 he became a volunteer Civil Defence and Emergency Management controller for the West Coast.

Prior to his election to Parliament, Hague was the Chief Executive of the West Coast District Health Board. Hague is also an author, a long time gay rights activist and a former executive director of the New Zealand AIDS Foundation.

Career and activism

Hague has been an activist for a number of causes. In the 1980s he was heavily involved in the campaign against sporting contacts with apartheid South Africa. In 1989 he co-authored Honouring the Treaty: an introduction for Pakeha to the Treaty of Waitangi. Hague also edited Terry Stewart's 1996 book Invisible families: a New Zealand resource for parents of lesbian and gay children.

Hague is openly gay and in 1988 began work as a research officer for the New Zealand AIDS Foundation, which provides education on HIV/AIDS issues and advocacy and support for those with HIV and AIDS. From 1998 to 2003 he was the Foundation's executive director.

He has represented New Zealand at United Nations, UNESCO and Commonwealth conferences on apartheid and on AIDS. He has also campaigned on behalf of cycling.

In 2005 Hague became Chief Executive of the West Coast District Health Board, where he had worked since 2003. Hague resigned in December 2008 to become a Member of Parliament.

Member of Parliament

Hague was placed at number seven on the Green Party list for the 2008 election. He gained the third highest number of candidate votes in the West Coast-Tasman electorate and was elected to Parliament as a list MP for the Green Party.

Hague again contested West Coast-Tasman in the 2011 and 2014 elections and was returned to Parliament as a list MP each time, being placed third on the Green Party list.

Hague was a member of the Health Committee for most of 2008 to 2016, and also spent time on the Governance and Administration Committee during that committee's consideration of the Marriage (Definition of Marriage) Amendment Bill, which legalised same-sex marriage in New Zealand in 2013. Hague said once the bill had passed its third reading, in April 2013, there would be a number of "incredibly emotional" weddings between gay couples.

Green Party co-leader Russel Norman indicated he would vacate that role in 2015. Hague contested the resulting leadership contest but ultimately placed second to fellow MP James Shaw.

Hague announced on 5 September 2016 that he would resign from parliament to become the CEO of Forest and Bird. He was replaced by Barry Coates.

At his retirement, Hague was the Green Party spokesperson for health (including Accident Compensation Corporation, sport and recreation), conservation, and Rainbow Issues.

Personal life
Hague was born in Aldershot, Hampshire, England, on 18 March 1960, and moved to New Zealand in 1973 with his family when he was 13 years old. He became a naturalised New Zealand citizen in 1978. Hague enjoys mountain biking, cycle touring and tramping. He has been with his partner since 1984, but has no plans to get married since Labour MP Louisa Wall's Marriage (Definition of Marriage) Amendment Bill passed.

References

External links

Green Party – MP biography for Kevin Hague
New Zealand Parliament – MP biography for Kevin Hague
Kevin Hague's twitter

Gay politicians
Green Party of Aotearoa New Zealand MPs
New Zealand activists
LGBT members of the Parliament of New Zealand
New Zealand LGBT rights activists
1960 births
Living people
New Zealand list MPs
English emigrants to New Zealand
Members of the New Zealand House of Representatives
21st-century New Zealand politicians
People from Greymouth
Naturalised citizens of New Zealand